Mount Shiribetsu is a volcano on the Japanese island of Hokkaido. The volcano last erupted hundreds of thousands of years before present.

See also 
 List of mountains in Japan
 List of volcanoes in Japan

References

External links 
 Shiribetsu Dake - Geological Survey of Japan
 Global Volcanism Program page for Mount Shiribetsu

Volcanoes of Hokkaido
Mountains of Hokkaido